Eis-zwei-Geissebei is a Carnival festival held in Rapperswil (Switzerland) on Shrove Tuesday.

History and origin 
Its origin may go back to the siege and destruction of the city of Rapperswil at St. Matthew in 1350 by Rudolf Brun, first mayor of the city of Zürich. At that time, compassionate citizens served food to hungry children through the windows of their houses, to which the current practice recalls.

As of today 
After the traditional "Herrenessen" (dinner of the council members) in the Rathaus Rapperswil and cabaret program with distinguished guests, hundreds of children gather in the main square on Shrove Tuesday. At exactly 15:15 the windows of the town hall open and a fanfare sounds. A council member asks, “Sind alli mini Buebe doo?” (Swiss German: Are all my boys here?), and the answer is given: “Joo! Eis - Zwei - Geissebei !” (Yes, one, two, goat-leg!), whereupon sausages, bread rolls and Biberli (a sweet) are dropped down to the children on the Hauptplatz (main square). Following the so-called Austeilete, in the evening there is intense activity, and the crowning of the carnival, all Guggenmusik (carnival marching bands) gathered on Lindenhof at Schloss Rapperswil to celebrate a roaring concert.

External links 

 Carnival on Verkehrsverein Rapperswil-Jona

Swiss folklore
Rapperswil-Jona
Culture of the canton of St. Gallen
Festivals in Switzerland
Carnivals in Switzerland
Tourist attractions in Rapperswil-Jona
Youth in Switzerland